Strysza may refer to the following places in Poland:

Strysza Buda
Strysza Góra